Gérard Daucourt (born 29 April 1941 in Delémont, Switzerland) was the Catholic Bishop of Nanterre 2002–2013 in the Hauts-de-Seine Département in the  Paris region, France.  Daucourt was ordained as a priest in 1966 when he served in Besançon, France, before subsequently serving as diocesan of Troyes (1992) and then of Orléans (1998).

Positions
Daucourt has made several strong statements (e.g. on the need to vote even if the most suitable available candidate's programme is not close to Christian principles, and criticising the bishop of Recife following excommunications pronounced after a child-mother underwent an abortion). He is close to the Greek orthodox hierarchy at the Phanar in Turkey and together with Cardinal Barbarin of Lyons spent the day of 13 April 2004 (the seventh centenary of the Fourth Crusade taking of Constantinople) in the company of Patriarch Bartholomew there.

References

1941 births
Living people
Bishops of Troyes
Bishops of Orléans
People from Delémont
20th-century Swiss Roman Catholic priests
21st-century French Roman Catholic bishops